Supermodified may refer to:

 Supermodified (album), a 2000 album by Amon Tobin
 Supermodified racing, a class of open wheel race car that races on short tracks in North America

See also